Ruth Olina Lødemel (born 18 May 1966 in Volda, Norway) is a Norwegian soprano, dancer, actor and composer.

Career 
After finishing her Examen artium at "Atlanten videregående skole" (1983–86), Lødemel has studied singing and vocal pedagogy. She is a graduate of Norwegian Academy of Music (1986) and Barratt Due Institute of Music (1991), and is in 2013 working on her master's degree in vocals at Høgskulen i Volda. Recently in 2013, Lødemel has traveled around with the play "Ervingen" in connection with "Språkåret", a musical play where Lødemel performs her own music together with the guitarist Øystein Dahle Egset.

Discography 
2003: Mellom Tusen Bakkar, album with Lødemes's own melodies to Ivar Aasen lyrics
 2016: Romsdalseggen, Hyllest Til Romsdal Og Andre Perler

References

External links 

Ruth Olina Lødemel at Harmonious.ly
«Opnar Språkåret med Ervingen» Article by "Ivar Aasen-tunet", 18 January 2012 (in Norwegian)
Ruth Olina Lødemel, "Ferdavisa" at YouTube

1966 births
Living people
Musicians from Volda
Norwegian classical composers
Norwegian women singers
Norwegian sopranos
Women classical composers